is a Japanese multinational air conditioning manufacturing company headquartered in Osaka. It has operations in Japan, China, Australia, the United States, India, Southeast Asia, Europe, the Middle East, Latin America, and Africa.

Daikin is the inventor of variable refrigerant flow (VRF) air conditioners. Having failed to trademark "VRF", Daikin later remarketed the systems as "VRV" (variable refrigerant volume). Daikin is an innovator in the split system air conditioning market, having made the first split and multi-split air conditioners. Daikin co-developed the R-410A refrigerant with Carrier.

History
In 1953, Daiflon or polychlorotrifluoroethylene was developed. In 1963 the company was renamed  and developed Neoflon. In 1982 it was renamed to the current Daikin Industries Ltd.

Daikin entered the North American air conditioning market in 2004.

In 2006, Daikin Industries acquired McQuay International, a Minneapolis, MN-based global corporation that designs, manufacturers and sells commercial, industrial and institutional heating, ventilation and air conditioning (HVAC) products, and in November of the same year purchased OYL Industries. These acquisitions made Daikin Industries a major global HVAC manufacturer, rivaling Carrier Corporation in total number of products produced, total dollar volume and worldwide territory coverage. In 2008, McQuay International was rebranded as Daikin-McQuay as Daikin began implementing many of its technologies (including the Daikin Inverter Compressor) and manufacturing processes into McQuay equipment and factories. However, in November 2013, the Daikin-McQuay group was again rebranded as Daikin Applied, ending 80 years of business for the McQuay name in the United States. Meanwhile, the McQuay brand continues to be used in China and Hong Kong.
   
In the filtration realm, Daikin acquired American Air Filter (AAF) in 2007, and Flanders in 2016. The resulting entity is known both as AAF International and AAF Flanders.
  
In 2008, Daikin purchased a 75% share of All World Machinery Supply based in Roscoe, Illinois. Daikin developed the hybrid hydraulic systems using technology from their Air Conditioning division. Facing the global demands on  reductions and the serious energy issues facing the world, this product aims to cut energy consumption in the manufacturing sector. In 2009, Daikin Airconditioning Philippines was established.

In August 2012 Daikin agreed to acquire Goodman Global from the San Francisco-based private equity firm Hellman & Friedman for $3.7 billion, after first planning to buy Goodman the previous year. In January 2011, Daikin had announced plans to buy Goodman Global at approximately US$4 billion valuation; however, the plans were delayed for a year by the 2011 Tōhoku earthquake and tsunami
The acquisition was expected to expand Daikin's presence in the United States and in duct-type and split-system air-conditioners, and was expected to make Daikin the world's largest maker of heating, ventilation and air-conditioning systems.

, Daikin Hydraulics marketed a line of piston pumps, vane pumps, manual pumps, solenoid valves, and flow and control valves, claiming their pump technology to be 50–70 percent more energy efficient than conventional technology.

In 2017, Daikin opened the Daikin Texas Technology Park, its largest plant and the fifth largest factory in the world. Costing $417 million, this 4.1-million-square-foot facility in Waller, Texas, will consolidate Goodman's manufacturing operations.

As of 2021, other companies representing additional Daikin brands include Motili and Quietflex.

On March 2nd 2023 Daikin announced they had acquired the San Diego-based leader in custom air-handling equipment manufacturer Alliance Air Products.

Business divisions and products
Daikin is organised into the following divisions, offering the following products:
 Air conditioning
Residential air conditioners
Residential air purifiers
Commercial-use air conditioners
Commercial-use air purifiers
Humidity-adjusting external air-processing units
Large-sized chillers
Marine container refrigeration units
Marine vessel air conditioners
 Chemicals
Fluorocarbons
Fluoroplastics
Fluoro coatings
Fluoroelastomers
Fluorinated oils
Oil- and water-repellent products
Mold release agents
Pharmaceuticals and intermediates
Semiconductor-etching products
Dry air suppliers
 Air filtration
Oil hydraulics
Industrial hydraulic equipment and systems
Mobile hydraulic equipment
Centralized lubrication equipment and systems
Medical equipment
Rebreathers and similar equipment
Home-use oxygen therapy equipment
 Electronics business
System management of product development process
Facility design CAD software
Molecular chemistry software

Daikin Industries, Ltd.
For quite some time, Daikin Industries, Ltd. has been doing business with independent dealers in Africa. However, in 2006, Daikin merged the UAE with the East African market by creating Daikin Middle East and Africa. On January 20, 2017, they sponsored the DAIKIN PREMIER LEAGUE - Season 7.

In August 2016, Daikin Industries Ltd opened a fully functional headquarters in Cairo, Egypt. Daikin Cairo is yet another move for the company to establish business in Africa. Plans are underway to open more headquarters.

Gallery

Slogans
 Ahlinya Masalah Tata Udara (Indonesia only, used in 1970-2004)
 AC Kelas Dunia (English: World Class AC, used between 2004-2016)
 The Future in Your Hand (2016-2019, 2020-present)
 Perfecting the Air (2019-2020)

References

External links

 
  Wiki collection of bibliographic works on Daikin

 
Conglomerate companies of Japan
Defense companies of Japan
Electronics companies of Japan
Heating, ventilation, and air conditioning companies
Medical technology companies of Japan
Conglomerate companies established in 1924
Manufacturing companies established in 1924
Japanese companies established in 1924
Japanese brands
Companies listed on the Osaka Exchange
Companies listed on the Tokyo Stock Exchange